The Rupert's Land Act 1868 (31 & 32 Vict. c.105) was an Act of the Parliament of the United Kingdom of Great Britain and Ireland (as it then was), authorizing the transfer of Rupert's Land from the control of the Hudson's Bay Company to the Dominion of Canada. Often confused with the Deed of Surrender,  the Act is different as it only expressed that the United Kingdom and Canada permitted the transfer but did not settle on the details of exchange with HBC which were then outlined in the Deed.

See also

The act resulted in other legislation that created or helped create three Canadian provinces that had been part of Rupert's Land:

 Manitoba Act 1870
 Alberta Act 1905
 Saskatchewan Act 1905
Deed of Surrender 1870

References

External links
 Online text of the Act

Legal history of Canada
1868 in British law
United Kingdom Acts of Parliament 1868
Hudson's Bay Company
1868 in Canadian law
Acts of the Parliament of the United Kingdom concerning Canada
Land law

Annexation